Stace England is a musician from Cobden, Illinois, United States. He has released several solo recordings including Salt Sex Slaves documenting the Old Slave House near Equality, Illinois, and Greetings From Cairo, Illinois documenting the history of that city.  Greetings From Cairo, Illinois was the subject of a radio documentary on VPRO Dutch National Broadcasting produced by the  musicologist and author Jan Donkers, and featured a vocal performance by alternative country musician Jason Ringenberg of Jason & the Scorchers.

Discography

Studio albums
 Peach Blossom Special (Relay Records, August, 1999)
 Lovey Dovey ALL the Time (Gnashville Sounds Records, February, 2003)
 Greetings From Cairo, Illinois (Gnashville Sounds Records, April, 2005)
 Salt Sex Slaves (Rankoutsider Records, November, 2007)
 The Amazing Oscar Micheaux  Stace England and the Salt Kings 2009

References

External links
Stace England official website
Rankoutsider Records

Year of birth missing (living people)
Living people
Musicians from Illinois
People from Union County, Illinois
Place of birth missing (living people)